JS Antalaha is a Malagasy football club based in Antalaha, Madagascar. The team has won the THB Champions League in 1973, qualifying them for the 1974 African Cup of Champions Clubs.

The team currently plays in the Malagasy Second Division.

Achievements
THB Champions League: 1
1973

Performance in CAF competitions
CAF Champions League: 1 appearance
1974 African Cup of Champions Clubs – first round

References

External links
:pl:JS Antalaha

Football clubs in Madagascar
Antananarivo